The Sundklakkstraumen Bridge is a cantilever road bridge that crosses the Sundklakkstraumen strait between the islands of Gimsøya (in the municipality of Vågan) and Vestvågøya (in the municipality of Vestvågøy) in Nordland county, Norway. The Sundklakkstraumen Bridge was opened in 1976 and it is one of many bridges that connect the islands of the Lofoten archipelago via the European route E10 highway.

See also
List of bridges in Norway
List of bridges in Norway by length
List of bridges
List of bridges by length

References

Vestvågøy
Vågan
Road bridges in Nordland
Bridges completed in 1976
1976 establishments in Norway
European route E10 in Norway